Microbacterium aerolatum is a rod shaped and gram positive bacteria that was found in the Vergilius Chapel (Virgilkapelle) of Vienna, Austria. This bacterium "shared the highest 16S rDNA sequence similarities with members of the genus Microbacterium, in particular Microbacterium foliorum, Microbacterium testaceum, Microbacterium esteraromaticum, Microbacterium keratanolyticum and Microbacterium arabinogalactanolyticum."

References

External links
Type strain of Microbacterium aerolatum at BacDive -  the Bacterial Diversity Metadatabase

aerolatum
Bacteria described in 2002